The Misleading Lady is a 1932 American pre-Code comedy film directed by Stuart Walker, and starring Claudette Colbert and Edmund Lowe. The film is based on the 1913 Broadway play by Charles W. Goddard and Paul Dickey. It is also a remake of the 1920 Metro silent film original which starred Bert Lytell and Lucy Cotton,  also based on the play.

On March 1, 1932, upon completion of this film, Paramount Pictures closed its Astoria Studios in Astoria, Queens, New York City.

The original play and its film depictions have been regarded as one of the origins of Napoleon delusions in the media.

Plot
Helen Steele (Claudette Colbert) is bored to death of her empty lifestyle as a socialite. She decides to become an actress, but cannot get to see producer Sydney Parker (Robert Strange). She learns that Parker will be at a party at the home of her friend Alice Connell. She wants the lead in Parker's play The Siren. He feels that she is too nice a girl to convincingly play the part, so she bets him that, in exchange for an audition, she will be able to make Parker's friend, mining engineer Jack Craigen (Edmund Lowe), fall in love with her within three days.

She records Jack's proposal of marriage on a phonograph record to provide proof, but then has second thoughts about what she has done. Before she can explain the situation to Jack, he is publicly humiliated when he and all of the other guests inadvertently hear the recording. As Jack storms out, he is introduced to Tracy, Helen's fiancé. Helen breaks off her engagement and rushes to Jack's room to try to explain. Jack kidnaps her and steals another guest's autogyro to take to his home.

When she tries to escape, he chains her up. While he is out getting some water to make coffee, she spots another man. He sneaks in, but then reveals that he is an escapee from a nearby mental asylum and thinks he is "Boney". She screams for help when he grabs a sword. Jack plays along and manages to trick the lunatic into entering a room, which Jack then locks. After Jack receives a call informing him that Tracy is on his way there, armed with a gun, he decides to let Helen go, but then they argue. During the ensuing struggle, she hits him on the head with a hammer, knocking him out, and runs away into the snow-filled woods. She manages to reach a forest ranger. Meanwhile, Boney gets out and locks Jack up.

Reporter Fitzpatrick shows up, and mistaking the madman for Jack, warns him that Tracy is coming. Then two asylum guards show up to collect Boney, but he manages to get away. Eventually, everything gets straightened out, and the couple reconcile.

Cast

Filming locations
Kaufman Astoria Studios - 3412 36th Street, Astoria, Queens, New York City

References

External links
 
 
 

1932 films
1932 romantic comedy films
American black-and-white films
American romantic comedy films
American films based on plays
Films directed by Stuart Walker
Paramount Pictures films
Films shot at Astoria Studios
1930s English-language films
1930s American films